is a song by Okinawa-based J-pop band Begin. It reached number 47 on the Oricon weekly charts and the band performed the song on NHK's 53rd annual Kōhaku Uta Gassen in 2002. It has become a song iconic of Okinawa Prefecture due to its use of eisa-inspired chanting. Its B-side that begins with "Soredemo Kurashi wa..." is noted as being one of the longest song titles in Japan.

Track listing

Cover versions
Because of the popularity of "Shimanchu nu Takara", it has been covered many times, including by Allister on the EP Guilty Pleasures, by Hearts Grow on their album Summer Chanpuru, by Speed member Hiroko Shimabukuro on her solo album Watashi no Okinawa, and by Beni on her album Covers 3.

References

External links
"Shimanchu nu Takara" in Begin's discography

2002 singles

2002 songs